Raiwala Junction railway station is a railway station at Raiwala and junction to Dehradun and Rishikesh stations, it is a significant but small railway station in Dehradun district, Uttarakhand with minimal facilities. Its Railway station code is RWL.The highway is less than under 500 meters from the station. The station consists of two platforms. The platforms are not well sheltered. It lacks many facilities including advanced ticket reservation counter and sanitation.

Gallery

References

External links

Railway stations in Dehradun district
Moradabad railway division
Rishikesh
Railway junction stations in Uttarakhand
Year of establishment missing